Maxime Laoun (born August 12, 1996) is a Canadian short-track speed skater.

Career

Junior
Laoun first represented Canada on the international stage at the 2014 World Junior Short Track Speed Skating Championships and competed for Canada at the 2015 and 2016 editions. Laoun's top placement came in 2016 when he finished fourth in the 500 metres event.

Senior
Laoun made his World Cup debut in 2018, helping Canada to a bronze medal in the 5000 metres relay at the Salt Lake City stop.

In November 2019, Laoun was injured, suffering a triple fracture to his tibia and fibula, and underwent three surgeries and rehab to return to training in May 2020.

On January 18, 2022, Laoun was named to Canada's 2022 Olympic team. Laoun won a gold medal as part of Canada's team in the 5000 m relay event.

References

External links

1996 births
Living people
French Quebecers
Canadian male short track speed skaters
Four Continents Short Track Speed Skating Championships medalists
Speed skaters from Montreal
Short track speed skaters at the 2022 Winter Olympics
Olympic short track speed skaters of Canada
Olympic gold medalists for Canada
Medalists at the 2022 Winter Olympics
Olympic medalists in short track speed skating
World Short Track Speed Skating Championships medalists
21st-century Canadian people